Margrethe von der Lühe (16 February 1741– 1 October 1826) was a Danish courtier; overhofmesterinde to the queen of Denmark–Norway, Caroline Matilda of Great Britain, from 1768 to 1770, and the queen dowager, Juliana Maria of Brunswick-Wolfenbüttel, from 1772 to 1784.

Life
Margrethe von der Lühe was the daughter of count Christian Christopher Holck and Ermegaard Sophie von Winterfeldt and the sister of Conrad Holck, the favorite of king Christian VII of Denmark. She was inscribed in the Protestant convent Roskilde adelige Kloster in 1750.

Margrethe von der Lühe served as lady-in-waiting to princess Louise of Denmark in 1766-68. She married baron Volrad August von der Lühe (1705-1778) in 1767.

In 1768, she became overhofmesterinde (Mistress of the Robes) to queen Caroline Mathilde, after her predecessor Anne Sofie von Berckentin had been unable to serve because of Caroline Matilda's disapproval that her original mistress of the robes Louise von Plessen had been replaced without her consent.  
Despite her relation to the king's favorite Holck, who was disliked by the queen, she was liked by Caroline Matilda: they had often taken walks together in the countryside previously, and Caroline Matilda reportedly liked her humor. She was given the Ordre de l'Union Parfaite in 1768. 
In 1770, she was replaced in her post by Charlotte Elisabeth Henriette Holstein.

In 1772, she was given the post of overhofmesterinde with the queen dowager Juliana Maria, the de facto regent at the time.   She belonged to the influential figures of the regency regime of Juliane Marie alongside kammarfrue Sophie Hedevig Jacobi (married to the king's reader Chr. Fr. Jacobi), Juliane Marie's secretary Johan Theodor Holm and crown prince Frederick's governor Professor Sporon; she is described as ambitious and reportedly used her influence for petitioners whose cause resulted in disagreement between the royal court and the council.  Niels Ditlev Riegels was reportedly one of her protegees and he may have had her to thank for acquiring a position at court in 1781.

Riegels participated in the 1784 coup that deposed Juliana Maria from power, and he dedicated a publication to Margrethe von der Lühe. The same year, Margrethe von der Lühe remarried Christian Frederik Numsen (1741-1811) and left court.

References

 Historisk Tidsskrift, 4. række, 2. bind, s. 695.
 Morten Petersen – Oplysningens gale hund, s. 37, Aschehoug, København, 2003
 At Octavia er større end Cleopatra og Stændernes ligevægt vigtig. Viist af græske og romerske skribenters samlede domme og fortællinger i tvende afhandlinger, 1788
 Dansk Biografisk Lexikon, bind X, s. 503
 Danmarks Adels Aarbog, Thiset, Hiort-Lorenzen, Bobé, Teisen., (Dansk Adelsforening), [1884 - 2011]., DAA 1925:440.

1741 births
1826 deaths
18th-century Danish people
Danish ladies-in-waiting
Danish nobility
Mistresses of the Robes (Denmark)
Ordre de l'Union Parfaite